Radan may refer to:

Radan (mountain) mountain in southern Serbia
Radan, Iran (disambiguation), villages in Iran
FK Radan Lebane, a Serbian football club based in Lebane, Serbia

Persons with the given name
 Radan Lenc (born 1991), Czech ice hockey player
 Radan Šunjevarić (born 1983), Serbian footballer
 Radan Kanev (born 1975), Bulgarian Member of the European Parliament

Persons with the surname
 Ahmad-Reza Radan, Iranian police chief
 Bahram Radan (born 1979), Iranian actor